The Dragon Ball video games are based on the manga series of the same name created by Akira Toriyama. From 1990, these games were released under the Dragon Ball Z banner, after the second anime television series. The games are of various genres, most prominently fighting games, role-playing games, and platform games, all featuring a varying roster of characters as depicted in the original series. Toriyama himself personally designed some of the video game original characters, such as Android 21 for Dragon Ball FighterZ, Mira and Towa for Dragon Ball Online, and Bonyū for Dragon Ball Z: Kakarot.

Dragon Ball games have been primarily released in Japan since 1986, with the majority of them being produced by Bandai. Games from the 16-bit and 32-bit eras were localized and released in France, Spain, Portugal, and other European countries due of the strong following the series already had in those countries. Up until 1994, with the exception of Dragon Ball: Shenlong no Nazo (which was released as Dragon Power, and was graphically altered), no games were localized for the North American market.

In 2000, Infogrames acquired the license to produce and release Dragon Ball games for the North American and international market. With the release of their first two titles in the franchise, 2002's Dragon Ball Z: The Legacy of Goku and Dragon Ball Z: Budokai, Infogrames more than doubled their sales. In January 2004, Atari paid $10 million for the exclusive US rights until January 2010. In 2008, Atari announced that over 12.7 million video game units based on the series had been sold since May 2002. Dragon Ball was Atari's top-earning licensed property, earning $85 million in 2005 and accounting for over 49% of their annual revenue in 2008. However, with the expiration of the Atari deal in 2009, Namco Bandai Games assumed the North American and European distribution rights, starting with the 2009 releases of Dragon Ball Z: Attack of the Saiyans, Dragon Ball: Raging Blast and Dragon Ball: Revenge of King Piccolo.

By December 2014, over 40 million video games based on the franchise had been sold worldwide. The Dragon Ball Xenoverse series sold a further 14million units between 2015 and 2021, Dragon Ball FighterZ sold over 8million  and Dragon Ball Z: Kakarot sold over  units, bringing software sales to over million units sold.


Consoles and PC games

1980s

1990s

2000s

2010s

2020s

Handheld console games

Arcade games

Mobile games

Commercial reception

Japan retail

Notes

References

External links
Official Bandai Namco website 

 
Dragon Ball (video game series)
Dragon Ball (video game series)
Dragon Ball
Dragon Ball
Dragon Ball
Video Games
Toei Animation video game projects